Aichryson is a genus of about 15 species of succulent, subtropical plants, mostly native to the Canary Islands, with a few in the Azores, Madeira and Morocco.

The species of Aichryson are not frost-resistant. They are related to Sempervivum, Jovibarba, Greenovia, Aeonium and Monanthes, readily seen in their similar flowers.

The genus name comes from a contraction of the Greek "aei" (always) and "chrysos" (gold).

Several species are cultivated as ornamental plants. The hybrid cultivar Aichryson × aizoides var. domesticum 'Variegatum' is a recipient of the Royal Horticultural Society's Award of Garden Merit.<ref name = RHSPF>{{cite web | url = https://www.rhs.org.uk/Plants/272993/Aichryson-x-aizoides-var-domesticum-Variegatum-(v)/Details | title = 'Aichryson × aizoides var. domesticum 'Variegatum' | website = www.rhs.org | publisher = Royal Horticultural Society | accessdate = 27 February 2020}}</ref> 

Taxonomy
Recent phylogenetic studies of Crassulaceae indicate that Aichryson is closely related to Monanthes and Aeonium (both genera are also largely endemic to the Canary Islands). Two other genera of Crassulaceae that have many-parted (polymerous) flowers (Sempervivum and Jovibarba) are not closely related to the three Canary Island genera.Mort et al. (2001). American Journal of Botany, 88: 76–91Mort et al. (2002). Systematic Botany, 27: 271–288

On the Canary Islands, the center of species diversity seems to be the island of La Palma.

Relationships within Aichryson were investigated by Fairfield et al. (2004) [Plant Systematics and Evolution 248: 71–83]. They found that the five subspecies of A. pachycaulon were not each other's closest relatives (monophyletic) and additional species may need to be erected after additional study.

Species
 Aichryson bethencourtianum Aichryson bollei Aichryson divaricatum Aichryson laxum Aichryson palmense Aichryson porphyrogennetos Aichryson tortuosum (gouty houseleek)
 Aichryson villosumOther species recognized by Nyffeler in Eggli 2004 are:
 Aichryson brevipetalum Aichryson dumosum Aichryson pachycaulon (five subspecies have been recognized)
 Aichryson parlatorei Aichryson punctatumRecently named species include:
 Aichryson bitumosum Aichryson santamariensis''

References

 
Crassulaceae genera
Flora of Macaronesia
Succulent plants